The Guangning Bridge is a historic stone arch bridge over the Eastern Zhejiang Canal in Yuecheng District of Shaoxing, Zhejiang, China.

History
The original bridge dates back to 1097, during the ruling of Emperor Zhezong of the Northern Song dynasty (960–1279), and was rebuilt between 1574 and 1575, during the reign of Wanli Emperor of the Ming dynasty (1368–1644). On 6 May 2013, it was listed among the seventh batch of "Major National Historical and Cultural Sites in Zhejiang" by the State Council of China.

Gallery

References

Bridges in Zhejiang
Arch bridges in China
Bridges completed in 1575
Ming dynasty architecture
Buildings and structures completed in 1575
1575 establishments in China
Major National Historical and Cultural Sites in Zhejiang